Dennis Fletcher Hammond (December 15, 1819October 31, 1891) was born in the Edgefield District of South Carolina. He moved to Georgia where he was a lawyer and, from 1855 to 1861, judge in the superior court Tallapoosa Judicial Circuit.

In Atlanta after the American Civil War, he was politically influenced by William Markham and became a Radical Republican supporting black suffrage.

When Markham refused to run for mayor, Hammond did and was able to briefly unite working-class whites to win the office. This was the last-gasp of Republican power in Reconstruction-era Atlanta.

After serving one term as mayor, he moved to Orlando, Florida in 1880 where he died a decade later.

1819 births
1891 deaths
Mayors of Atlanta
Georgia (U.S. state) Republicans
19th-century American politicians